Brachys floricola is a species of metallic wood-boring beetle in the family Buprestidae. It is native to North America, and chiefly to the continental United States.

References

Further reading

 
 
 

Buprestidae
Articles created by Qbugbot
Beetles described in 1900